Edward III (13 November 1312 – 21 June 1377), also known as Edward of Windsor before his accession, was King of England from January 1327 until his death in 1377. He is noted for his military success and for restoring royal authority after the disastrous and unorthodox reign of his father, Edward II. EdwardIII transformed the Kingdom of England into one of the most formidable military powers in Europe. His fifty-year reign was one of the longest in English history, and saw vital developments in legislation and government, in particular the evolution of the English Parliament, as well as the ravages of the Black Death. He outlived his eldest son, Edward the Black Prince, and the throne passed to his grandson, Richard II.

Edward was crowned at age fourteen after his father was deposed by his mother, Isabella of France, and her lover Roger Mortimer. At age seventeen he led a successful coup d'état against Mortimer, the de facto ruler of the country, and began his personal reign. After a successful campaign in Scotland he declared himself rightful heir to the French throne in 1337. This started what became known as the Hundred Years' War. Following some initial setbacks, this first phase of the war went exceptionally well for England; victories at Crécy and Poitiers led to the highly favourable Treaty of Brétigny, in which England made territorial gains, and Edward renounced his claim to the French throne. This phase would become known as the Edwardian War. Edward's later years were marked by international failure and domestic strife, largely as a result of his inactivity and poor health.

Edward was a temperamental man but capable of unusual clemency. He was in many ways a conventional king whose main interest was warfare. Admired in his own time and for centuries after, he was denounced as an irresponsible adventurer by later Whig historians such as Bishop William Stubbs; modern historians credit him with some significant achievements.

Early life (1312–1327) 

Edward was born at Windsor Castle on 13 November 1312, and was often called Edward of Windsor in his early years. The reign of his father, Edward II, was a particularly problematic period of English history. One source of contention was the king's inactivity, and repeated failure, in the ongoing war with Scotland. Another controversial issue was the king's exclusive patronage of a small group of royal favourites. The birth of a male heir in 1312 temporarily improved EdwardII's position in relation to the baronial opposition. To bolster further the independent prestige of the young prince, the king had him created Earl of Chester at only twelve days of age.

In 1325, Edward II was faced with a demand from his brother-in-law, Charles IV of France, to perform homage for the English Duchy of Aquitaine. Edward was reluctant to leave the country, as discontent was once again brewing domestically, particularly over his relationship with the favourite Hugh Despenser the Younger. Instead, he had his son Edward created Duke of Aquitaine in his place and sent him to France to perform the homage. The young Edward was accompanied by his mother Isabella, who was the sister of King Charles, and was meant to negotiate a peace treaty with the French. While in France, Isabella conspired with the exiled Roger Mortimer to have Edward deposed. To build up diplomatic and military support for the venture, Isabella had her son engaged to the twelve-year-old Philippa of Hainault. An invasion of England was launched and EdwardII's forces deserted him completely. Isabella and Mortimer summoned a parliament, and the king was forced to relinquish the throne to his son, who was proclaimed king in London on 25 January 1327. The new king was crowned as EdwardIII at Westminster Abbey on 1February at the age of 14.

Early reign (1327–1337)

Mortimer's rule and fall
It was not long before the new reign also met with other problems caused by the central position at court of Mortimer, who was now the de facto ruler of England. Mortimer used his power to acquire noble estates and titles, and his unpopularity grew with the humiliating defeat by the Scots at the Battle of Stanhope Park in the county of Durham, and the ensuing Treaty of Edinburgh–Northampton, signed with the Scots in 1328. Also the young king came into conflict with his guardian. Mortimer knew his position in relation to the king was precarious and subjected Edward to disrespect. The tension increased after Edward and Philippa, who had married at York Minster on 24 January 1328, had a son, Edward of Woodstock, on 15 June 1330. Eventually, the king decided to take direct action against Mortimer. Aided by his close companion William Montagu, 3rd Baron Montagu, and a small number of other trusted men, Edward took Mortimer by surprise at Nottingham Castle on 19 October 1330. Mortimer was executed and EdwardIII's personal reign began.

War in Scotland 

Edward III was not content with the peace agreement made in his name, but the renewal of the war with Scotland originated in private, rather than royal initiative. A group of English magnates known as The Disinherited, who had lost land in Scotland by the peace accord, staged an invasion of Scotland and won a great victory at the Battle of Dupplin Moor in 1332. They attempted to install Edward Balliol as king of Scotland in place of the infant DavidII, but Balliol was soon expelled and was forced to seek the help of EdwardIII. The English king responded by laying siege to the important border town of Berwick and defeated a large relieving army at the Battle of Halidon Hill. He reinstated Balliol on the throne and received a substantial amount of land in southern Scotland. These victories proved hard to sustain, as forces loyal to DavidII gradually regained control of the country. In 1338, EdwardIII was forced to agree to a truce with the Scots.

One reason for the change of strategy towards Scotland was a growing concern for the relationship between England and France. For as long as Scotland and France were in an alliance, the English were faced with the prospect of fighting a war on two fronts. The French carried out raids on English coastal towns, leading to rumours in England of a full-scale French invasion.

Mid-reign (1337–1360)

Sluys 

In 1337, Philip VI of France confiscated the English king's Duchy of Aquitaine and the county of Ponthieu. Instead of seeking a peaceful resolution to the conflict by paying homage to the French king, as his father had done, Edward responded by laying claim to the French crown as the grandson of Philip IV. The French rejected this based on the precedents for agnatic succession set in 1316 and 1322. Instead, they upheld the rights of PhilipIV's nephew, King PhilipVI (an agnatic descendant of the House of France), thereby setting the stage for the Hundred Years' War (see family tree below). In the early stages of the war, Edward's strategy was to build alliances with other Continental rulers. In 1338, Louis IV, Holy Roman Emperor, named Edward vicar-general of the Holy Roman Empire and promised his support. As late as 1373, the Anglo-Portuguese Treaty of 1373 established an Anglo-Portuguese Alliance. These measures produced few results; the only major military victory in this phase of the war was the English naval victory at Sluys on 24 June 1340, which secured its control of the English Channel.

Cost of war 

Meanwhile, the fiscal pressure on the kingdom caused by Edward's expensive alliances led to discontent at home. The regency council at home was frustrated by the mounting national debt, while the king and his commanders on the Continent were angered by the failure of the government in England to provide sufficient funds. To deal with the situation, Edward himself returned to England, arriving in London unannounced on 30 November 1340. Finding the affairs of the realm in disorder, he purged the royal administration of a great number of ministers and judges. These measures did not bring domestic stability, and a stand-off ensued between the king and John de Stratford, Archbishop of Canterbury, during which Stratford's relatives Robert Stratford, Bishop of Chichester, and Henry de Stratford were temporarily stripped of title and imprisoned respectively. Stratford claimed that Edward had violated the laws of the land by arresting royal officers. A certain level of conciliation was reached at the parliament of April 1341. Here Edward was forced to accept severe limitations to his financial and administrative freedom, in return for a grant of taxation. Yet in October the same year, the king repudiated this statute and Archbishop Stratford was politically ostracised. The extraordinary circumstances of the April parliament had forced the king into submission, but under normal circumstances the powers of the king in medieval England were virtually unlimited, a fact that Edward was able to exploit.

Historian Nicholas Rodger called EdwardIII's claim to be the "Sovereign of the Seas" into question, arguing there was hardly any royal navy before the reign of HenryV (1413–1422). Despite Rodger's view, King John had already developed a royal fleet of galleys and had attempted to establish an administration for these ships and others which were arrested (privately owned ships pulled into royal/national service). HenryIII, his successor, continued this work. Notwithstanding the fact that he, along with his predecessor, had hoped to develop a strong and efficient naval administration, their endeavours produced one that was informal and mostly ad hoc. A formal naval administration emerged during Edward's reign, comprising lay administrators and led by William de Clewre, Matthew de Torksey and John de Haytfield successively bearing the title of Clerk of the King's Ships. Robert de Crull was the last to fill this position during EdwardIII's reign and would have the longest tenure in this position. It was during his tenure that Edward's naval administration would become a base for what evolved during the reigns of successors such as Henry VIII's Council of Marine and Navy Board and Charles I's Board of Admiralty. Rodger also argues that for much of the fourteenth century, the French had the upper hand, apart from Sluys in 1340 and, perhaps, off Winchelsea in 1350. Yet, the French never invaded England and King John II of France died in captivity in England. There was a need for an English navy to play a role in this and to handle other matters, such as the insurrection of the Anglo-Irish lords and acts of piracy.

Crécy and Poitiers 

By the early 1340s, it was clear that Edward's policy of alliances was too costly, and yielded too few results. The following years saw more direct involvement by English armies, including in the Breton War of Succession, but these interventions also proved fruitless at first. Edward defaulted on Florentine loans of 1,365,000 florins, resulting in the ruin of the lenders.

A change came in July 1346, when Edward staged a major offensive, sailing for Normandy with a force of 15,000 men. His army sacked the city of Caen, and marched across northern France, to meet up with English forces in Flanders. It was not Edward's initial intention to engage the French army, but at Crécy, just north of the Somme, he found favourable terrain and decided to fight a pursuing army led by PhilipVI. On 26 August, the English army defeated a far larger French army in the Battle of Crécy. Shortly after this, on 17 October, an English army defeated and captured King DavidII of Scotland at the Battle of Neville's Cross. With his northern borders secured, Edward felt free to continue his major offensive against France, laying siege to the town of Calais. The operation was the greatest English venture of the Hundred Years' War, involving an army of 35,000 men. The siege started on 4September 1346, and lasted until the town surrendered on 3August 1347.

After the fall of Calais, factors outside of Edward's control forced him to wind down the war effort. In 1348, the Black Death struck England with full force, killing a third or more of the country's population. This loss of manpower led to a shortage of farm labour, and a corresponding rise in wages. The great landowners struggled with the shortage of manpower and the resulting inflation in labour cost. To curb the rise in wages, the king and parliament responded with the Ordinance of Labourers in 1349, followed by the Statute of Labourers in 1351. These attempts to regulate wages could not succeed in the long run, but in the short term they were enforced with great vigour. All in all, the plague did not lead to a full-scale breakdown of government and society, and recovery was remarkably swift. This was to a large extent thanks to the competent leadership of royal administrators such as Treasurer William Edington and Chief Justice William de Shareshull.

It was not until the mid-1350s that military operations on the Continent were resumed on a large scale. In 1356, Edward's eldest son, Edward, Prince of Wales, won an important victory in the Battle of Poitiers. The greatly outnumbered English forces not only routed the French, but captured the French king JohnII and his youngest son, Philip. After a succession of victories, the English held great possessions in France, the French king was in English custody, and the French central government had almost totally collapsed. There has been a historical debate as to whether Edward's claim to the French crown originally was genuine, or if it was simply a political ploy meant to put pressure on the French government. Regardless of the original intent, the stated claim now seemed to be within reach. Yet a campaign in 1359, meant to complete the undertaking, was inconclusive. In 1360, therefore, Edward accepted the Treaty of Brétigny, whereby he renounced his claims to the French throne, but secured his extended French possessions in full sovereignty.

Government

Legislation 

The middle years of Edward's reign were a period of significant legislative activity. Perhaps the best-known piece of legislation was the Statute of Labourers of 1351, which addressed the labour shortage problem caused by the Black Death. The statute fixed wages at their pre-plague level and checked peasant mobility by asserting that lords had first claim on their men's services. In spite of concerted efforts to uphold the statute, it eventually failed due to competition among landowners for labour. The law has been described as an attempt "to legislate against the law of supply and demand", which made it doomed to fail. Nevertheless, the labour shortage had created a community of interest between the smaller landowners of the House of Commons and the greater landowners of the House of Lords. The resulting measures angered the peasants, leading to the Peasants' Revolt of 1381.

The reign of Edward III coincided with the so-called Babylonian Captivity of the papacy at Avignon. During the wars with France, opposition emerged in England against perceived injustices by a papacy largely controlled by the French crown. Papal taxation of the English Church was suspected to be financing the nation's enemies, while the practice of provisions (the Pope's providing benefices for clerics) caused resentment in the English population. The statutes of Provisors and Praemunire, of 1350 and 1353 respectively, aimed to amend this by banning papal benefices, as well as limiting the power of the papal court over English subjects. The statutes did not sever the ties between the king and the Pope, who were equally dependent upon each other.

Other legislation of importance includes the Treason Act 1351. It was precisely the harmony of the reign that allowed a consensus on the definition of this controversial crime. Yet the most significant legal reform was probably that concerning the Justices of the Peace. This institution began before the reign of EdwardIII but, by 1350, the justices had been given the power not only to investigate crimes and make arrests, but also to try cases, including those of felony. With this, an enduring fixture in the administration of local English justice had been created.

Parliament and taxation 

Parliament as a representative institution was already well established by the time of EdwardIII, but the reign was nevertheless central to its development. During this period, membership in the English baronage, formerly a somewhat indistinct group, became restricted to those who received a personal summons to parliament. This happened as parliament gradually developed into a bicameral institution, composed of a House of Lords and a House of Commons. Yet it was not in the Lords, but in the Commons that the greatest changes took place, with the expanding political role of the Commons. Informative is the Good Parliament, where the Commons for the first time—albeit with noble support—were responsible for precipitating a political crisis. In the process, both the procedure of impeachment and the office of the Speaker were created. Even though the political gains were of only temporary duration, this parliament represented a watershed in English political history.

The political influence of the Commons originally lay in their right to grant taxes. The financial demands of the Hundred Years' War were enormous, and the king and his ministers tried different methods of covering the expenses. The king had a steady income from crown lands, and could also take up substantial loans from Italian and domestic financiers. To finance warfare, he had to resort to taxation of his subjects. Taxation took two primary forms: levy and customs. The levy was a grant of a proportion of all moveable property, normally a tenth for towns and a fifteenth for farmland. This could produce large sums of money, but each such levy had to be approved by parliament, and the king had to prove the necessity. The customs therefore provided a welcome supplement, as a steady and reliable source of income. An "ancient duty" on the export of wool had existed since 1275. Edward I had tried to introduce an additional duty on wool, but this unpopular maltolt, or "unjust exaction", was soon abandoned. Then, from 1336 onwards, a series of schemes aimed at increasing royal revenues from wool export were introduced. After some initial problems and discontent, it was agreed through the Statute of the Staple of 1353 that the new customs should be approved by parliament, though in reality they became permanent.

Through the steady taxation of EdwardIII's reign, parliament—and in particular the Commons—gained political influence. A consensus emerged that in order for a tax to be just, the king had to prove its necessity, it had to be granted by the community of the realm, and it had to be to the benefit of that community. In addition to imposing taxes, parliament would also present petitions for redress of grievances to the king, most often concerning misgovernment by royal officials. This way the system was beneficial for both parties. Through this process the commons, and the community they represented, became increasingly politically aware, and the foundation was laid for the particular English brand of constitutional monarchy.

Chivalry and national identity 

Central to Edward III's policy was reliance on the higher nobility for purposes of war and administration. While his father had regularly been in conflict with a great portion of his peerage, EdwardIII successfully created a spirit of camaraderie between himself and his greatest subjects. Both EdwardI and EdwardII had been limited in their policy towards the nobility, allowing the creation of few new peerages during the sixty years preceding EdwardIII's reign. EdwardIII reversed this trend when, in 1337, as a preparation for the imminent war, he created six new earls on the same day.

At the same time, Edward expanded the ranks of the peerage upwards, by introducing the new title of duke for close relatives of the king. Furthermore, he bolstered the sense of community within this group by the creation of the Order of the Garter, probably in 1348. A plan from 1344 to revive the Round Table of King Arthur never came to fruition, but the new order carried connotations from this legend by the circular shape of the garter. Edward's wartime experiences during the Crécy campaign (1346–7) seem to have been a determining factor in his abandonment of the Round Table project. It has been argued that the total warfare tactics employed by the English at Crécy in 1346 were contrary to Arthurian ideals and made Arthur a problematic paradigm for Edward, especially at the time of the institution of the Garter. There are no formal references to King Arthur and the Round Table in the surviving early fifteenth-century copies of the Statutes of the Garter, but the Garter Feast of 1358 did involve a round table game. Thus there was some overlap between the projected Round Table fellowship and the actualized Order of the Garter. Polydore Vergil tells of how the young Joan of Kent—allegedly the king's favourite at the time—accidentally dropped her garter at a ball at Calais. King Edward responded to the ensuing ridicule of the crowd by tying the garter around his own knee with the words honi soit qui mal y pense (shame on him who thinks ill of it).

This reinforcement of the aristocracy and the emerging sense of national identity must be seen in conjunction with the war in France. Just as the war with Scotland had done, the fear of a French invasion helped strengthen a sense of national unity, and nationalise the aristocracy that had been largely Anglo-Norman since the Norman conquest. Since the time of EdwardI, popular myth suggested that the French planned to extinguish the English language, and as his grandfather had done, EdwardIII made the most of this scare. As a result, the English language experienced a strong revival; in 1362, a Statute of Pleading ordered English to be used in law courts, and the year after, Parliament was for the first time opened in English. At the same time, the vernacular saw a revival as a literary language, through the works of William Langland, John Gower and especially The Canterbury Tales by Geoffrey Chaucer. Yet the extent of this Anglicisation must not be exaggerated. The statute of 1362 was in fact written in the French language and had little immediate effect, and parliament was opened in that language as late as 1377. The Order of the Garter, though a distinctly English institution, included also foreign members such as John IV, Duke of Brittany, and Robert of Namur.

Later years and death (1360–1377) 

While Edward's early reign had been energetic and successful, his later years were marked by inertia, military failure and political strife. The day-to-day affairs of the state had less appeal to Edward than military campaigning, so during the 1360s Edward increasingly relied on the help of his subordinates, in particular William Wykeham A relative upstart, Wykeham was made Keeper of the Privy Seal in 1363 and Chancellor in 1367, though due to political difficulties connected with his inexperience, the Parliament forced him to resign the chancellorship in 1371. Compounding Edward's difficulties were the deaths of his most trusted men, some from the 1361–62 recurrence of the plague. William Montagu, 1st Earl of Salisbury, Edward's companion in the 1330 coup, died as early as 1344. William de Clinton, Earl of Huntingdon, who had also been with the king at Nottingham, died in 1354. One of the earls created in 1337, William de Bohun, 1st Earl of Northampton, died in 1360, and the next year Henry of Grosmont, perhaps the greatest of Edward's captains, succumbed to what was probably plague. Their deaths left the majority of the magnates younger and more naturally aligned to the princes than to the king himself.

Increasingly, Edward began to rely on his sons for the leadership of military operations. The king's second son, Lionel of Antwerp, attempted to subdue by force the largely autonomous Anglo-Irish lords in Ireland. The venture failed, and the only lasting mark he left were the suppressive Statutes of Kilkenny in 1366. In France, meanwhile, the decade following the Treaty of Brétigny was one of relative tranquillity, but on 8April 1364 JohnII died in captivity in England, after unsuccessfully trying to raise his own ransom at home. He was followed by the vigorous CharlesV, who enlisted the help of the capable Bertrand du Guesclin, Constable of France. In 1369, the French war started anew, and Edward's son John of Gaunt was given the responsibility of a military campaign. The effort failed, and with the Treaty of Bruges in 1375, the great English possessions in France were reduced to only the coastal towns of Calais, Bordeaux, and Bayonne.

Military failure abroad, and the associated fiscal pressure of constant campaigns, led to political discontent at home. The problems came to a head in the parliament of 1376, the so-called Good Parliament. The parliament was called to grant taxation, but the House of Commons took the opportunity to address specific grievances. In particular, criticism was directed at some of the king's closest advisors. Lord Chamberlain William Latimer, 4th Baron Latimer, and Steward of the Household John Neville, 3rd Baron Neville de Raby, were dismissed from their positions. Edward's mistress, Alice Perrers, who was seen to hold far too much power over the ageing king, was banished from court. Yet the real adversary of the Commons, supported by powerful men such as Wykeham and Edmund Mortimer, 3rd Earl of March, was John of Gaunt. Both the king and Edward of Woodstock were by this time incapacitated by illness, leaving Gaunt in virtual control of government. Gaunt was forced to give in to the demands of parliament, but at its next convocation, in 1377, most of the achievements of the Good Parliament were reversed.

Edward did not have much to do with any of this; after around 1375 he played a limited role in the government of the realm. Around 29 September 1376 he fell ill with a large abscess. After a brief period of recovery in February 1377, the king died of a stroke at Sheen on 21 June.

Succession 

Edward III was succeeded by his ten-year-old grandson, King Richard II, son of Edward of Woodstock, since Woodstock himself had died on 8June 1376. In 1376, Edward had signed letters patent on the order of succession to the crown, citing in second position John of Gaunt, born in 1340, but ignoring Philippa, daughter of Lionel, born in 1338. Philippa's exclusion contrasted with a decision by Edward I in 1290, which had recognized the right of women to inherit the crown and to pass it on to their descendants. The order of succession determined in 1376 led the House of Lancaster to the throne in 1399 (John of Gaunt was Duke of Lancaster), whereas the rule decided by Edward I would have favoured Philippa's descendants, among them the House of York, beginning with Richard of York, her great-grandson.

Legacy 

Edward III enjoyed unprecedented popularity in his own lifetime, and even the troubles of his later reign were never blamed directly on the king himself. His contemporary Jean Froissart wrote in his Chronicles: "His like had not been seen since the days of King Arthur." This view persisted for a while but, with time, the image of the king changed. The Whig historians of a later age preferred constitutional reform to foreign conquest and accused Edward of ignoring his responsibilities to his own nation. Bishop Stubbs, in his work The Constitutional History of England, states:

This view is challenged in a 1960 article titled "EdwardIII and the Historians", in which May McKisack points out the teleological nature of Stubbs' judgement. A medieval king could not be expected to work towards some future ideal of a parliamentary monarchy as if it were good in itself; rather, his role was a pragmatic one – to maintain order and solve problems as they arose. At this, Edward excelled. Edward had also been accused of endowing his younger sons too liberally and thereby promoting dynastic strife culminating in the Wars of the Roses. This claim was rejected by K. B. McFarlane, who argued that this was not only the common policy of the age, but also the best. Later biographers of the king such as Mark Ormrod and Ian Mortimer have followed this historiographical trend. The older negative view has not completely disappeared; as recently as 2001, Norman Cantor described Edward as an "avaricious and sadistic thug" and a "destructive and merciless force".

From what is known of Edward's character, he could be impulsive and temperamental, as was seen by his actions against Stratford and the ministers in 1340/41. At the same time, he was well known for his clemency; Mortimer's grandson was not only absolved, he came to play an important part in the French wars and was eventually made a Knight of the Garter. Both in his religious views and his interests, Edward was a conventional man. His favourite pursuit was the art of war and, in this, he conformed to the medieval notion of good kingship. As a warrior he was so successful that one modern military historian has described him as the greatest general in English history. He seems to have been unusually devoted to his wife, Queen Philippa. Much has been made of Edward's sexual licentiousness, but there is no evidence of any infidelity on his part before Alice Perrers became his lover, and by that time the queen was already terminally ill. This devotion extended to the rest of the family as well; in contrast to so many of his predecessors, Edward never experienced opposition from any of his five adult sons.

Issue

Sons 

 Edward the Black Prince (1330–1376), eldest son and heir apparent, born at Woodstock Palace, Oxfordshire. He predeceased his father, having in 1361 married his cousin Joan, Countess of Kent, by whom he had issue: King RichardII.
 William of Hatfield (1337–1337), second son, born at Hatfield, South Yorkshire, died shortly after birth and was buried in York Minster.
 Lionel of Antwerp, 1st Duke of Clarence (1338–1368), third son (second surviving son), born at Antwerp in the Duchy of Brabant, where his father was based during his negotiations with Jacob van Artevelde. In 1352 he married firstly Elizabeth de Burgh, 4th Countess of Ulster, without male issue, but his female issue was the senior royal ancestor of the Yorkist King EdwardIV: Philippa, 5th Countess of Ulster. Descent from Lionel was the basis of the Yorkist claim to the throne, not direct paternal descent from the 1st Duke of York, a more junior line. Secondly, in 1368, Lionel married Violante Visconti, without issue.
 John of Gaunt, 1st Duke of Lancaster (1340–1399), fourth son (third surviving son), born at "Gaunt" (Ghent) in the County of Flanders, which city was an important buyer of English wool, then the foundation of English prosperity. In 1359, he married firstly his distant cousin the great heiress Blanche of Lancaster, descended from the 1st Earl of Lancaster, a younger son of King HenryIII. By Blanche he had issue: Henry of Bolingbroke, who became King HenryIV, having seized the throne from his first cousin King RichardII. In 1371, he married secondly the Infanta Constance of Castile, by whom he had issue. In 1396, he married thirdly his mistress Katherine Swynford, by whom he had illegitimate issue, later legitimised as the House of Beaufort. His great-granddaughter Margaret Beaufort was the mother of Henry VII, who claimed the throne as the representative of the Lancastrian line.
 Edmund of Langley, 1st Duke of York (1341–1402), fifth son (fourth surviving son), born at Kings Langley Palace, Hertfordshire. He married firstly the Infanta Isabella of Castile, by whom he had issue, sister of the Infanta Constance of Castile, second wife of his elder brother John of Gaunt, 1st Duke of Lancaster. Secondly in 1392 he married his second cousin Joan Holland, without issue. His great-grandson (the 4th Duke of York) became King EdwardIV in 1461, having deposed his half-second cousin the Lancastrian King HenryVI. EdwardIV's daughter Elizabeth of York was mother of King HenryVIII.
 Thomas of Windsor (1347–1348), sixth son, born at Windsor Castle, died in infancy of the plague and was buried at King's Langley Priory, Hertfordshire.
 William of Windsor (1348–1348), seventh son, born before 24 June 1348 at Windsor Castle, died in infancy probably on 9 July1348, buried on 5 September 1348 in Westminster Abbey;
 Thomas of Woodstock, 1st Duke of Gloucester (1355–1397), eighth son (fifth surviving son), born at Woodstock Palace in Oxfordshire; in 1376 he married Eleanor de Bohun, by whom he had issue. His eventual heir was the Bourchier family, Earls of Bath, of Tawstock in Devon, today represented by the Wrey baronets, who quarter the arms of Thomas of Woodstock and continue as lords of the manor of Tawstock.

Daughters 

 Isabella of England (1332–), born at Woodstock Palace, Oxfordshire, in 1365 married Enguerrand VII de Coucy, 1st Earl of Bedford, by whom she had issue.
 Joan of England (1333/4–1348), born in the Tower of London; she was betrothed to Peter of Castile but died of the black death en route to Castile before the marriage could take place. Peter's two daughters from his union with María de Padilla married Joan's younger brothers John of Gaunt, Duke of Lancaster and Edmund of Langley, 1st Duke of York.
 Blanche (1342–1342), born in the Tower of London, died shortly after birth and was buried in Westminster Abbey.
 Mary of Waltham (1344–1361), born at Bishop's Waltham, Hampshire; in 1361 she married John IV, Duke of Brittany, without issue.
 Margaret (Countess of Pembroke) (1346–1361), born at Windsor Castle; in 1359 she married John Hastings, 2nd Earl of Pembroke, without issue.

Genealogical tables

Contemporaries and the Hundred Years' War 
Edward's relationship to contemporary kings of France, Navarre, and Scotland

Ancestor to the Wars of the Roses 
Edward was also the ancestor of the families of the Wars of the Roses.

Explanatory notes

References

Citations

General and cited sources

External links 

 Edward III at the official website of the British Monarchy
 Edward III at BBC History
 The Medieval Sourcebook has some sources relating to the reign of EdwardIII:
 The Ordinance of Labourers, 1349
 The Statute of Labourers, 1351
 Thomas Walsingham's account of the Good Parliament of 1376
 
 

 
1312 births
1377 deaths
14th-century English monarchs
14th-century peers of France
Burials at Westminster Abbey
Earls of Chester
English people of French descent
English people of Spanish descent
English people of the Wars of Scottish Independence
English pretenders to the French throne
House of Plantagenet
Knights of the Garter
Leaders who took power by coup
Medieval child monarchs
People of the Hundred Years' War
Sons of kings
Children of Edward II of England